Allocatelliglobosispora scoriae is a non-motile bacterium from the genus Allocatelliglobosispora which has been isolated from volcanic ash in Jeju, Korea.

References 

Micromonosporaceae
Bacteria described in 2011
Monotypic bacteria genera